In negotiation theory, the best alternative to a negotiated agreement or BATNA (no deal option) refers to the most advantageous alternative course of action a party can take if negotiations fail and an agreement cannot be reached. The BATNA could include diverse situations, such as suspension of negotiations, transition to another negotiating partner, appeal to the court's ruling, the execution of strikes, and the formation of other forms of alliances. BATNA is the key focus and the driving force behind a successful negotiator.  A party should generally not accept a worse resolution than its BATNA. Care should be taken, however, to ensure that deals are accurately valued, taking into account all considerations, such as relationship value, time value of money and the likelihood that the other party will live up to their side of the bargain. These other considerations are often difficult to value since they are frequently based on uncertain or qualitative considerations rather than easily measurable and quantifiable factors.

Oftentimes, it is even more difficult to determine the BATNA of the other party. However, this information is crucial as the BATNA determines the other side's negotiation power. Sometimes, conclusions can be drawn by determining his/her main interests and the negotiation itself can be used to verify or falsify the assumptions. If, for example, it is assumed that a very early delivery date is of key importance to the negotiating partner, deliberately setting a later delivery date can be proposed. If this late delivery date is decidedly rejected, the desired delivery date is likely to be of great importance.

History 
BATNA was developed by negotiation researchers Roger Fisher and William Ury of the Harvard Program on Negotiation (PON), in their series of books on principled negotiation that started with Getting to YES, equivalent to the game theory concept of a disagreement point from bargaining problems pioneered by Nobel Laureate John Forbes Nash decades earlier. A Nash Equilibrium is reached among a group of players when no player can benefit from changing strategies if every other player sticks to their current strategy. For example, Amy and Phil are in Nash Equilibrium if Amy is making the best decision she can while taking into account Phil's decision, and if Phil is making the best decision he can while taking into account Amy's decision. Likewise, a group of players are in Nash Equilibrium if each one is making the best decision that he or she can while taking into account the decisions of others.

Overview
The BATNA is often seen by negotiators not as a safety net, but rather as a point of leverage in negotiations. Although a negotiator's alternative options should, in theory, be straightforward to evaluate, the effort to understand which alternative represents a party's BATNA is often not invested. Options need to be actual and actionable to be of value, however, without the investment of time, options will frequently be included that fail on one of these criteria. Most managers overestimate their BATNA whilst simultaneously investing too little time into researching their real options. This can result in poor or faulty decision making and negotiation outcomes. Negotiators also need to be aware of the other negotiator's BATNA and to identify how it compares to what they are offering.

Some people may adopt aggressive, coercive, threatening and/or deceptive techniques. This is known as a hard negotiation style; a theoretical example of this is adversarial approach style negotiation. Others may employ a soft style, which is friendly, trusting, compromising, and conflict avoiding. According to Fisher and Ury, when hard negotiators meet soft negotiators, the hard negotiators usually win their position, but at the cost of potentially damaging the long-term relationship between the parties.

Attractive alternatives are needed to develop a strong BATNA. In the book Getting to YES: Negotiating Agreement Without Giving In, the authors give three suggestions for how to accomplish this:

 Creating a list of actions one might take if no agreement is reached
 Converting some of the more promising ideas and transforming them into tangible and partial alternatives
 Selecting the alternative that sounds best

In negotiations involving different cultures, all parties need to account for cultural cognitive behaviors and should not let judgments and biases affect the negotiation. The individual should be separate from the objective.

The purpose here, as Philip Gulliver mentions, is for negotiation parties to be aware.

Preparation at all levels, including prejudice-free thoughts, emotion-free behavior, bias-free behavior are helpful according to Morris and Gelfand.

BATNA-based tactics and order of negotiations 
Because of the importance of the BATNA for negotiation success, several tactics focus on weakening the opponent's BATNA. This may be achieved e.g. by striving for exclusive negotiations, delaying or accelerating the ongoing negotiations, or limiting the negotiation partner to technical systems. If a negotiator is faced with such tactics it is his/her task to examine the possible consequences for their own BATNA and to prevent or counteract any deterioration of the own party's BATNA.

The BATNA can also influence the order in which negotiations are taken up with potential contracting partners. A sequential approach is favorable. In a sequential approach, one starts negotiations with the less favored partners and continues negotiations with the preferred option afterward. This way, there is the BATNA of a contract with the less favored partner.

Difference between BATNA and reservation value 
A BATNA represents one party’s best option if negotiations fail, whereas a reservation value represents the worst deal they are willing to accept. A reservation value should never be less than the BATNA. When purchasing a bike, for example, the BATNA may represent the option of shopping at another dealer. Depending on the cost of finding other dealers, the reservation value would represent the highest price you are willing to pay.

Process to develop the best alternative to a negotiated agreement 

 First, list out all possible alternatives to the current negotiation - what could you do if the negotiations fail?
 Determine the worth of each alternative - how much does each alternative mean to you?
 Go with the option that provides the most value to you (this is your best alternative to a negotiated agreement)
 Calculate the lowest valued-deal you’re willing to accept after determining your BATNA.

Types of BATNA 
There are three types of BATNA:
 Walk-away BATNA
 Interactive BATNA
 Third-party BATNA

Walk-away BATNA 
If the seller doesn’t want to drop the asking price to less than an alternative option, the buyer will walk away and buy the other alternative. Professional negotiators and researchers alike regard BATNA, or “walk away” outcome as the primary source of relative power for a negotiator. However, relying on alternatives can be risky. A party’s relative power in a negotiation is their ability to use resources to influence the circumstances of another, and the role of a BATNA in this regard can range from significant to non-existent.

Interactive BATNA 
Interactive BATNAs are sought when one or more parties in a negotiation are not cooperating with the other parties. There are many types of interactive BATNAs, but the three primary ones are:

 Economic: For example, a newspaper forgetting to replace an inappropriate ad in one issue resulting in 50% of their subscribers unsubscribing and them losing half of their ad revenue. In this case, the unsubscribers would be the non-cooperative party.
 Political: For example, a political party filibustering a piece of legislation another party is trying to pass. In this case, the party filibustering would be the non-cooperative one.
 Social: For example, a group of protestors not succumbing to the police's attempts at displacement. In this case, the protestors would be the non-cooperative party.

Third-party BATNA 
Third-party BATNAs are sought when two parties in a negotiation are unable to come to a common conclusion on their own or the dispute between them is endless. So, a third party is required in the form of either:
 Mediation: A neutral third party is brought in to help the disputing parties resolve the dispute on their own. Mediation does not resolve the dispute, they just facilitate it.
 Arbitration: A neutral third party is brought in to arbitrate or resolve the negotiation through a BATNA. Unlike mediation, they resolve the issue.
 Litigation: When the negotiation takes a turn for the worst, an authoritative third party intervenes in the form of law and the issue is resolved in court with both parties having to comply with the court's decision.

See also 
 Conflict resolution research
 Getting to Yes
 Opportunity cost
 Zone of possible agreement
 Vicente Blanco Gaspar

References

External links 
 BATNA Explained by Dr David Venter
 Alternative definition of BATNA
 BATNA Explained by Negotiation Experts

Negotiation
Dispute resolution
Business terms